Hello Hello may refer to:

 "Hello Hello" (song), a 2007 song by Superfly
 "Hello Hello", a song by Caravan from the album If I Could Do It All Over Again, I'd Do It All Over You, 1970
 "Hello Hello", a song by Elton John and Lady Gaga from the film Gnomeo & Juliet, 2011
 "Hello Hello", a song by Inna, Melon and Dance Fruits Music, 2022
 "Hello Hello", a song by Bic Runga from the album Belle, 2011
 "Hello Hello", a song by Missy Higgins from the album The Ol' Razzle Dazzle, 2012
 "Hello Hello", a song by Trixie Mattel from the album The Blonde & Pink Albums, 2022
 "Hello Hello", a song by Sopwith Camel, 1966
 "Hello Hello", a song by Brown Sauce, 1981

 "Hello, Hello", a song by Sophie Ellis-Bextor from the album Shoot from the Hip, 2003
 "Hello, Hello", a song by Kay Thompson and the Williams Brothers later performed by Lia Minnelli on the concert Liza's at The Palace...., 2008–2009

See Also
'Allo 'Allo!, 1980s British sitcom
 "Hello Hello", the opening line of the controversial loyalist song, Billy Boys